The 2018 state elections in Minas Gerais were held on 7 October, as part of the general elections in the Federal District and in 26 states, to elect one Governor and Vice Governor, two Senators and four substitutes for Senator, 53 Federal Deputies, and 77 State Deputies. In the election for Governor, entrepreneur Romeu Zema (NOVO) finished in first place with 42.73% of the valid votes, followed by Senator Antonio Anastasia (PSDB) with 29.06%. Incumbent Governor Fernando Pimentel (PT) couldn't re-elect, placing third place with 23.12% of the votes. As the first place didn't reach 50% of the votes, a second round took place on 28 October. Zema was elect Governor with 71.80% of the votes, and Anastasia placed second with 28.20%.

For the Federal Senate, the then Federal Deputy Rodrigo Pacheco (DEM) and the journalist and presenter Carlos Viana (PHS) were elect to fill the seats of Aécio Neves (PSDB) and Zezé Perrella (MDB). They had, respectively, 20.49% and 20.22% of the votes. Dinis Pinheiro (SD) place third with 18.42% of the votes, and former president Dilma Rousseff (PT), who had been impeached two years before, placed fourth with 15.35% of the votes.

Gubernatorial candidates

Candidates in runoff

Candidates failing to make runoff

Opinion polls

Governor

First round

Second round

Senator

Debates

Results

Governor

Senator

Chamber of Deputies

Legislative Assembly

References

2018 Brazilian gubernatorial elections
Minas Gerais gubernatorial elections
October 2018 events in South America